Larbalestier is a Saxon surname from Devon, where the family held a seat as Lords of the Manor. Notable people with the surname include:

David Larbalestier, American physicist
Justine Larbalestier (born 1967), Australian writer
Simon Larbalestier (born 1962), Welsh photographer

References